"Dakiti" (also titled "Dákiti") is a song by Puerto Rican rappers Bad Bunny and Jhayco. It was released on October 30, 2020 through Rimas Entertainment as the lead single from Bad Bunny's third studio album, El Último Tour Del Mundo. The island-tinged song simultaneously debuted in the top ten on the Billboard Hot 100, and number one on the Hot Latin Songs chart, becoming the first song in history to do so. It peaked at number five on the Hot 100, and simultaneously topped both the Billboard Global 200 and Global Excl. U.S., the first Spanish-language song to do so. It is the 79th most played song on Spotify with 1,470,908,772 streams and has more than 2.5 billion total views on YouTube and Spotify as of August 2022. The third collaboration between the artists reached number one in Argentina, Dominican Republic, Mexico, Spain, Sweden and the top 10 in France, Italy, Netherlands, Portugal and almost all of Latin America. The song also spent a total of 27 weeks at the top of the Hot Latin Songs chart; it could easily be the signature song of both Cortez and Martinez.

Background 
The song was first teased by Bad Bunny on October 26, 2020, via his Instagram account; he previewed the song's instrumental and stated that it was coming "soon". Bad Bunny and Cortez previously collaborated on remixes for "No Me Conoce" and "Cómo Se Siente". Bad Bunny stated: "In this case, it's the first time we were able to work together in the studio, unlike the other two songs that were done via phone. Sharing ideas in person is the key of the success of the song". Following the song's release, Bunny tweeted a video of him doing a dance to the song, challenging his followers to post their own videos of the dance. "Dakiti" marks the first solo material from Bad Bunny since the release of his May 2020 album Las que no iban a salir.

Recording and composition 
Bad Bunny explained how the creative process of the song was different than his previous works: "I usually have a main idea for a song. For this one, though, Jhay composed the base, the initial rhythm and the main idea together with Mora. I then added to the evolution of the production, rhythm and lyrics with Tainy. It was a combined effort, which is unusual for me, but when one works as a team, great things come out".

"Dakiti" is a "slow-burning", "futuristic" reggaeton song with "wavy" electronic sounds backing the production. It contains an edgy synth riff, "lush" ambience, as well as heavier, thumping beats, and, as noted by ¡Hola!s Rebecah Jacobs, is "a departure from the more aggressive reggaetón celebrations we're used to hearing from Bad Bunny on his 2020 releases, YHLQMDLG and Las que no iban a salir. Lyrically, the song sees the artists aiming to win over their love interests by flaunting their luxurious lifestyles. The title of the song has been speculated to refer to either the name of a beach or possibly an old bar in Puerto Rico.

Music video 
The song's release was accompanied by an "aquatic" music video directed by Stillz, who worked on some of Bad Bunny's previous visuals, including "Yo Perreo Sola". The video sees Bad Bunny and Cortez performing the song in an isolated floating box in the middle of the ocean. They also party underwater, on a boat and pilot their own submarines. Bad Bunny sports braided curls and a skirt, with Cortez wearing jewelry by Ian Delucca. The video concludes with a big truck driving by with a message that reads: :El Último Tour Del Mundo" ("The Last Tour of the World").

Chart performance 
The song debuted at number nine on the US Billboard Hot 100. It became Bad Bunny's third Hot 100 top 10, following "I Like It", his collaboration with Cardi B and J Balvin, and "Mia", featuring Drake, both in 2018. "Dakiti" also joined "Mia" as the only all-Spanish-language songs to have ever debuted in the Hot 100's top 10. The song marked Cortez's first top 10 on the chart. It reached number five in its fifth charting week.

It also debuted at number one on the Hot Latin Songs chart, marking the first time a song debuted in the Hot 100 top 10 and atop Hot Latin Songs simultaneously. It became the third song in 2020 to debut at number one on the latter chart; the previous two debuts also belong to Bad Bunny ("Si Veo a Tu Mamá" and "Un Día (One Day)"). The song earned the biggest streaming week for a Latin song, garnering 22.2 million streams, besting Bad Bunny's own "Si Veo a Tu Mamá", which accumulated 19 million streams in March 2020.

"Dakiti" topped the Billboard Global 200 chart for two weeks. It became the first song to earn 100 million streams two weeks in a row on the chart. It also became the first Spanish-language song to top both the Global 200 and the Global Excl. U.S. 200, doing so simultaneously.

Bad Bunny said of the song's success, "This one is very special because it's a song that came out of nothing. We didn't expect to have success of this magnitude. Working with Jhay, both Latinos from Puerto Rico representing at a global level, fills me with pride as we are competing amongst great songs and artists".

Charts

Weekly charts

Year-end charts

All-time charts

Certifications

Release history

See also 
 List of Billboard Global 200 number ones of 2020
 List of Billboard Hot Latin Songs and Latin Airplay number ones of 2020

References 

2020 singles
2020 songs
Bad Bunny songs
Jhayco songs
Number-one singles in Spain
Songs written by Bad Bunny
Songs written by Tainy
Song recordings produced by Tainy
Spanish-language songs
Number-one singles in Mexico
Argentina Hot 100 number-one singles
Billboard Global 200 number-one singles
Billboard Global Excl. U.S. number-one singles